Les Abrets en Dauphiné (literally Les Abrets in Dauphiné) is a commune in the Isère department of southeastern France. The municipality was established on 1 January 2016 and consists of the former communes of Les Abrets, La Bâtie-Divisin and Fitilieu.

Population

See also 
Communes of the Isère department

References 

Communes of Isère